East Branch Perkiomen Creek is a  tributary of Perkiomen Creek in  southeast Pennsylvania in the United States.

The East Branch Perkiomen Creek is born in Bucks County and joins Perkiomen Creek at Schwenksville in Montgomery County.

Local road signs label the creek as Branch Creek. The creek passes under the Mood's Covered Bridge in East Rockhill Township.

See also
List of rivers of Pennsylvania

References

External links
U.S. Geological Survey: PA stream gaging stations

Rivers of Pennsylvania
Tributaries of the Schuylkill River
Rivers of Montgomery County, Pennsylvania
Rivers of Bucks County, Pennsylvania